Jaan Oks (1884 Ratla, Pärsamaa Parish, Saare County – 1918) was an Estonian writer and poet.

In 1908 he moved to Samara Governorate to teach the local Estonian community's children. There he was also a sacrist. In 1911, he was dismissed from his job. During the 1910s, he was homeless. In 1912, he was transported to Saare County as a prisoner.

Oks died in 1918 due to bone tuberculosis.

Works
 1918: prose "Tume inimeselaps" ('A Dark Child of Man') 
 2003: collection (30-40 poems) "Otsija metsas" ('The Seeker in the Forest')
 2004: collection "Orjapojad" ('Sons of Slaves')

References

1884 births
1918 deaths
20th-century Estonian writers
20th-century Estonian poets
Estonian male poets
20th-century deaths from tuberculosis
Tuberculosis deaths in Estonia